Melanie Smith (born December 16, 1962) is a former American actress. She appeared as Jerry Seinfeld's girlfriend, Rachel, in three episodes of Seinfeld. She was also the third actress to portray Tora Ziyal on Star Trek: Deep Space Nine and had a starring role as Emily Stewart on As the World Turns from 1987 to 1992. Smith has since retired from acting and runs a yoga studio in New Hope, Pennsylvania.

Filmography

Film

Television

References

External links 
 

Living people
People from the Scranton–Wilkes-Barre metropolitan area
American film actresses
American soap opera actresses
American television actresses
1962 births